TS 37 was a South Atlantic convoy of the TS series which ran during World War II from Takoradi to Freetown. It lost seven ships in "one of the most remarkable convoy attacks of the war."

Background
TS 37 was a convoy of the TS/ST series, organized to protect merchant traffic between Takoradi on the Gold Coast (now Ghana) and Freetown, Sierra Leone. Freetown was the main naval base for the Royal Navy’s West Africa Station and was the departure and dispersal point for SL/OS convoys to Britain. 
The TS series had been established in September 1942 in response to U-boat depredations amongst independently routed shipping on the coast of West Africa.

Ships involved
TS 37 comprised 19 merchant ships. The escort comprised HMS Bellwort, a Flower-class corvette, and three ASW trawlers, Arran, Birdlip and Fandango. The Senior Officer (Escort) was Lt. NFR Gill, the captain of Bellwort. TS 37 departed Takoradi on 26 April, but one ship, dropped out on and was forced to return, escorted by Fandango.

U-boats involved
U Boat Command (BdU) had organized a force of three U-boats, with a supply boat for logistical support off the coast of West Africa. 
, skippered by KL (later KK) Werner Henke (Knight's Cross), had been dispatched with two others as relief and reinforcement to this group. U-515 was the only U-boat involved in the attack on TS 37.

Action
TS 37 departed Takoradi on 26 April, and by 29 April was some 120 miles from  Freetown where it was sighted by U-515.

Henke made his approach and just before 11pm (GMT, local time) staged his first assault. Approaching from the rear of the convoy he fired six torpedoes, scoring hits on four ships. With a new and effective magnetic influence detonators in use all four hits were fatal: Kota Tjandi, Nagina, Bandar Shapour and Corabella were sunk, while a counter-attack by the escorts was ineffective. Arran and Birdlip commenced picking up survivors, though some were not found until two days later. 
Henke (according to his log) surfaced to find Birdlip picking up survivors and made an attack on her, though he does not describe how, and it had no effect. 
 
Before dawn on the following morning U-515 was able to make a second attack, this time hitting three ships. Two, City of Singapore and Mokambo, were sunk, while the third, Clan Macpherson, was damaged. She was taken in tow and was handed over to salvage tugs during the day, but foundered before reaching port. On receiving notice that the convoy was under attack, three destroyers (and ) were dispatched as reinforcement, but were unable to make contact before Henke had retired from the scene. Later that day the twelve surviving ships of TS 37 were brought without further harm to harbour at Freetown.

Aftermath
Henke's attack has been described as “one of the most remarkable convoy attacks of the war”  and is on a par with Schepke's attack on SC 11 and Kretschmer's on SC 7. 
Returning to base on 24 June after an “arduous but productive” 124-day patrol (one of the longest undertaken by the U-boat Arm) Henke was awarded the Oak Leaves to his Knight's Cross.

By contrast Churchill described the incident as “deplorable” but the Admiralty countered, noting that losses were unavoidable when the enemy mounted operations in areas previously free from attack. In fact TS 37 had been the only TS convoy to be attacked since the start of the series in September 1942, and up to 29/30 April 743 ships had been conveyed safely on the route. Just one other ship from a TS convoy (and two stragglers) were during the rest of the conflict.

Table

Merchant ships

Escorts

U-boat

References

Bibliography
 Clay Blair : Hitler's U-boat War [Volume 2]: The Hunted 1942–1945 (1998).   
Michael Gannon : Black May ( 1998). 
 
Stephen Roskill : The War at Sea 1939–1945 Vol II (1956). ISBN (none)

TS037